Torres Blancas is a mixed use concrete building in Madrid, Spain, designed in 1961 by Spanish architect Francisco Javier Sáenz de Oiza. The structure is a noted example of Spanish Organicism. Spanish industrialist Juan Huarte commissioned the project which initially included two residential towers.

References 

Buildings and structures in Chamartín District, Madrid
Brutalist architecture in Spain
Buildings and structures completed in 1969